I.S.C.V.: King Richard is a 1981 role-playing game supplement for Traveller published by FASA.

Contents
I.S.C.V.: King Richard is a set of starship deck plans, a 5000-ton first class luxury liner.

Publication history
I.S.C.V.: King Richard was written by Jordan Weisman, with art by William H. Keith Jr., and was published in 1981 by FASA as an 8-page pamphlet with 21 large map sheets.

Reception
William A. Barton reviewed I.S.C.V.: King Richard in The Space Gamer No. 42. Barton commented that "Although the quality of their earlier products made me hesitant to try this one out, in I.S.C.V. King Richard, FASA has pretty much redeemed themselves. You should find the King Richard an interesting addition to your campaign."

Reviews
 Different Worlds #18 (Jan., 1982)

References

Role-playing game supplements introduced in 1981
Traveller (role-playing game) supplements